David Lepper (born 15 September 1945) is a British Labour and Co-operative politician who was the Member of Parliament (MP) for Brighton Pavilion from 1997 to 2010.

Non-political life
Lepper was educated at the University of Kent where he took a degree in English and American literature. He also has a PGCE qualification from the University of Sussex and a Postgraduate Diploma in Film from the Polytechnic of Central London. Prior to his election to parliament Lepper worked as a secondary school English and Media Studies teacher at Westlain Grammar School and Falmer High School, both in Brighton. Lepper is married to Jeane (born Jeane Stroud); they have one son and one daughter.

On 24 July 2012, David Lepper was conferred the honorary degree of Master of Laws from the University of Brighton.

Politics
Lepper was the first Labour leader of Brighton Borough Council, and Mayor in 1993–94. His wife Jeane is a former mayor and councillor within the Labour group on Brighton and Hove Council. In parliament, Lepper chaired the Broadcasting select committee. Lepper supported the building of the new stadium for Brighton & Hove Albion FC.

In 2006, he announced that he would be standing down at the next general election.

References

External links
Ask Aristotle: David Lepper MP The Guardian
David Lepper MP TheyWorkForYou.com

1945 births
Living people
Labour Co-operative MPs for English constituencies
Alumni of the University of Kent
Alumni of the University of Sussex
Alumni of the University of Westminster
UK MPs 1997–2001
UK MPs 2001–2005
UK MPs 2005–2010
Councillors in East Sussex
Politicians from Brighton and Hove